6th Infantry may refer to:
6th Infantry Division, a Division of the U.S. Army known as the "Sight Seein' Sixth"
6th Infantry Regiment (United States), a regiment of U.S. infantry most famously commanded by Zachary Taylor